Telecorporación Salvadoreña (TCS) is a television network corporation in El Salvador. Telecorporación Salvadoreña is a group of local television stations formed by channels 2, 4, 6, and TCS+. (channel 35) TCS launched began transmissions on channel 31. The channel stopped analogical broadcasts in NTSC and was launched in the TDT on the same frequency, within the virtual channel 31.1, with programming of the TCS files in test signal Most of the time each channel has an independent programming schedule, but the channels do share limited programming and simulcasts, particularly on weekday mornings. When linked together, the network name (Telecorporación Salvadoreña) is used instead of the channels' individual names (2, 4 , and 6).

Besides the four television stations, TCS also has two radio stations: VOX FM Vox FM Web Site and Que Buena Que Buena Web Site

Terrestrial networks

Shows 

Telecorporacion Salvadoreña's shows include on air:

 Secretos de cocina
A cocinar!
 Viva la Mañana
 Invasión 51
>Play
 La Polémica
Liberadas
 DC4
Llevatelo
Salvadoreños Comprometidos (September 2013 - Present) (the program is held once every year)
Prendi2 (Started April 03, 2022)
Ven a Cantar (Coming soon May or June 2022)

Off-Air Programs 
 Brinka
 Club Disney
 La Hora Warner
 Chivisimo
 Hollywood Pack
 Duro Blandito
Comencemos Ya!
 Código Fama El Salvador
 Fin de Semana
 ¿Quién quiere ser millonario?
 Nuestra Belleza El Salvador
 Bailando por un sueño El Salvador
 Cantando por un sueño El Salvador
 Tal Para Cual
 Conéctate 2Night
 La Comedia Hora
 Dale Watts
 Código Fama El Salvador
 Acoplados
 Sabaton
Alo Verano
"PLOP"
 Reto Centroamericano de Baile
 El Jardín de la Tía Bubu
 Jardín Infantil
 Variedades del 6
 Ticket con Francisco Cáceres
 Éxitos Musicales
El número uno
 El Número Uno Kids
 El Número Uno VIP
Calle 7 El Salvador (until the seventh season)
Tu Nai
Top Chef El Salvador 1º 2º y 3º 
A Todo o Nada
Grandiosas
Ponte Fit
Picante y Sabroso (currently on TVX)
Fit TV (currently on TVX)
Estrellas del Baile (on air 09/29/2019)
Yo me llamo (canceled due to pandemic COVID-19)
En Vivo Con...
Tele Cash
Trato Hecho (Deal or No Deal) (season 5 September 6, 2020 - ended September 5, 2021 with 47 participants and delivered a quantity of $79,733.50 to each participants throughout the program development.)
Top Chef Estrellas (Starts on September 26 2021 - ended on December 19 2021) resulting as the winner Marjorie Madrid with the amount of $ 25,000 USD.
Domingo para Todos (May 27 1987 - December 26 2021) (the closure was known due to the sponsors and the ratings of spectators that it put to end because of the Covid-19.)

International 
On June 1, 2008, Telecorporación Salvadoreña create an alliance with DirecTV where in Channel 429 of Telecentro, DirecTV is the one in charge to transmit all the national programs of TCS in the United States and Canada.

This is one of the passages for the internationalization of the television transmitter but important of El Salvador, another one of the plans to future that it has TCS is to inaugurate the live signal of the 4 channels of the television transmitter in its Internet page.

The alliances on which it counts TCS, are another one of the factors that contribute to the exchange of information and variety of programming on which it counts. The strategic alliances that the television transmitter owns are:

Logos 
Since its foundation, Telecorporación Salvadoreña uses the "TCS" initials as an abbreviation of the company.

References 

 
Television stations in El Salvador
Television channels and stations established in 1965